Rice baijiu, also known as rice-fragrance baijiu (米香型白酒), is a variety of Chinese baijiu. Unlike other types of baijiu, it is distilled mainly from rice rather than from sorghum or other grains. It has a characteristic rice fragrance.

One famous brand of rice baijiu is called Sanhuajiu (三花酒; literally "three flower liquor"), which is produced in Guilin, China.

Name
The name "rice fragrance baijiu" may mislead the drinker, who may regard it as simply ordinary baijiu flavoured by rice. In fact, this kind of distilled beverage differs from sorghum-based baijiu in that its main ingredient is rice.

"Mibaijiu" is also the name of a type of fermented Chinese rice wine produced in the Jiangsu province.

See also
Awamori
Rice wine
Rượu đế
Shōchū
Soju

References

Rice drinks
Baijiu